Emmanuel Church is an historic Episcopal church at 42 Dearborn Street in Newport, Rhode Island.  The church began as a mission of Newport's Trinity Church in 1841. In 1852, it was admitted into the diocese as Emmanuel Free Church in its own right.

The current building was designed by architectural firm Cram, Goodhue & Ferguson in Late Gothic Revival style.  It was built between 1900 and 1902, thanks to a donation in memory of John Nicholas Brown I by his widow, Natalie Bayard Brown. Brown donated the reredos and murals in 1921 in honor of Armistice Day.   In the early 1930s, E. Power Biggs served as its organist.  It was added to the National Register of Historic Places in 1996.

See also
National Register of Historic Places listings in Newport County, Rhode Island

References

External links

Churches in Newport, Rhode Island
Churches completed in 1902
20th-century Episcopal church buildings
Churches on the National Register of Historic Places in Rhode Island
Episcopal churches in Rhode Island
Ralph Adams Cram church buildings
Gothic Revival church buildings in Rhode Island
National Register of Historic Places in Newport, Rhode Island
Historic district contributing properties in Rhode Island